Pseudoneuroctena is a monotypic genus of flies from the family Dryomyzidae.

Distribution
Known from the Palearctic and Nearctic realms.

Species
P. senilis (Zetterstedt, 1846)

References

Dryomyzidae
Monotypic Brachycera genera
Sciomyzoidea genera